Margaret Court and Virginia Wade were the defending champions but only Virginia Wade competed that year with Lesley Hunt. Lesley Hunt and Virginia Wade lost in the semifinals to Rosemary Casals and Billie Jean King.

Rosemary Casals and Billie Jean King won the title by defeating Françoise Dürr and Betty Stöve 7–6, 6–7, 6–4 in the final. The winning team earned $4,500.

Seeds

Draw

Finals

Top half

Bottom half

References

External links
1974 US Open – Women's draws and results at the International Tennis Federation

Women's Doubles
US Open (tennis) by year – Women's doubles
1974 in women's tennis
1974 in American women's sports